This is a list of notable applications that use GTK and/or Clutter for their GUI widgets. Such applications blend well with desktop environments that are GTK-based as well, such as GNOME, Cinnamon, LXDE, MATE, Pantheon, Sugar, Xfce or ROX Desktop.

Official GNOME applications
The GNOME Project, i.e. all the people involved with the development of the GNOME desktop environment, is the biggest contributor to GTK, and the GNOME Core Applications as well as the GNOME Games employ the newest GUI widgets from the cutting-edge version of GTK and demonstrates their capabilities.

Shells, user interfaces, application launchers 
 GNOME Shell – the desktop graphical GUI shell introduced with GNOME version 3.0
 Cinnamon fork of the GNOME Shell
 GNOME Panel – applications launcher 
 Maynard, a shell for Weston by Collabora originally for the Raspberry Pi
 GNOME Panel and forks
 Budgie is a distro-agnostic desktop environment

Education software
 Tux Typing – typing tutor for children
 DrGeo – geometry software
 GCompris – educational entertainment for children (legacy version only)

Utility software

Operating system administration 
 Disk Usage Analyzer – Disk-usage analyzer
 GNOME Disks – utility for the hard disk; partition editor, S.M.A.R.T. monitoring, formerly known as Gnome Disk Utility or palimpsest
 GParted – utility for the hard disk; partition editor
 GDM – X display manager
 GNOME Keyring Manager – Password manager
 GNOME Screensaver – Simple screensaver configuration
 Alacarte – Menu editor

End-user utilities 

Archive Manager – archive manager
Cheese –  webcam application
Conduit Synchronizer – Photo/music/notes/files etc. synchronization
Eye of GNOME – official image-viewer for GNOME
Getting Things GNOME! – Personal tasks management software
gnee – A GNOME GUI and a panel applet that can be used to record and replay test cases.
GNOME Boxes – Application to access remote or virtual systems
GNOME Screenshot – take screenshots of desktop and windows
GNOME Calculator – calculator
GNOME Commander – Two-panel graphical file manager
GNOME Files – File manager, formerly called Nautilus
GNOME Terminal – Terminal emulator
Gnote – Note-taking software in C++
 – drop-down terminal emulator
Gucharmap – Character map
Guvcview –  webcam application
Orca – Scriptable screen-reader
Scribes – Text editor
Seahorse – PGP and SSH key-manager
Sushi – File previewer
Terminator - Terminal emulator
 – drop-down terminal emulator
Tomboy – Note-taking software in C#
Vinagre – VNC client
Vino – VNC server (deprecated)

Games
 GNOME Games – collection of games in Vala and C, now archived
 Lutris - video game manager/launcher

Abstract strategy games 
 GNOME Chess – new 2d graphical front-end written in Vala
 PyChess – Chess implementation

Puzzle games 
 GNOME Mines – Minesweeper-clone
 gbrainy – Brain teaser game

Graphics

Graphics editors 
 GIMP – an extensive raster graphics editor
 Inkscape – an extensive vector graphics editor
 MyPaint – an extensive raster graphics editor, for digital painters
 Pinta – a minimalist raster graphics editor

Image viewers
 Shotwell – Photo manager
 F-Spot – Photo manager
 gThumb – Image viewer

Internet software

Web browsers 

 Web – default GNOME web-browser
 Midori – default Xfce web-browser
 Uzbl – minimalist web-browser
 xombrero – minimalist web-browser

Email clients 

 Balsa – Email client
 Claws Mail
 Evolution (software)
 Geary
 Modest (email client)
 Pantheon Mail
 Sylpheed

Software for inter-person communication 

 Empathy – instant-messaging client, VoIP and videoconferencing
 Pidgin – Instant messenger
 Smuxi – User-friendly IRC Client
 HexChat – IRC client
 Gajim – Instant messenger

File sharing 
 Deluge — BitTorrent client
 Transmission – BitTorrent client
 Gwget – Download manager framework
 Gwibber – Microblogging client
 Liferea – RSS feed reader
 Pan – Usenet news reader

Office software
 AbiWord – word processor
 GnuCash – Personal and small business finance manager
 Gnumeric – Spreadsheet
 BOND – Database frontend
 Evince – pdf viewer
 GNOME Dictionary – Dictionary
 Evolution – Integrated mail, contacts, and calendar
 OCRFeeder – a graphical front-end for the Optical character recognition engines CuneiForm, GOCR, Ocrad and Tesseract

Tools for programming and development 
 GNOME Builder – Integrated development environment
 Anjuta – Integrated development environment
 Glade Interface Designer – a Graphical user interface builder
 Gedit – Text editor
 Leafpad – Lightweight text editor
 Lazarus - cross-platform visual IDE for RAD using the Free Pascal compiler
 Devhelp – API documentation browser
 Nemiver – C and C++ debugger
 Geany – text editor suitable for programming
 Meld – diff-viewer
 PIDA – IDE
 Xojo – IDE
 Zenity – execute GTK dialog boxes from shell scripts
 Bluefish – Web design editor
 MonoDevelop – Integrated development environment
 ActiveState Komodo – Integrated development environment
 Gtranslator – uses gettext
 poedit – gettext
 Scala (software)

Optical disc software

Optical disc authoring software 
 Brasero – optical disc authoring software, graphical front-end to burn CDs/DVDs

Optical disc ripping software 
 Grip – CD ripper and player
 Thoggen – DVD backup utility

Audio 
 Software audio players (free and open-source)
 SoundConverter (software)
 GNOME Sound Juicer

Video 
 Veejay – Live video, Vjing

Video players 
 GNOME Videos – the GNOME default video player

Video editors 
 Gnome Subtitles – Video subtitling
 Pitivi – Video editor
 Cinelerra - Video editor

Science software

Chemistry 
Despite the immense popularity of Qt, there continues to be science software using the GUI widgets of version 2 of GTK toolkit. Whether this is going to remain that way, or whether the software will be ported to some current version of GTK (maybe GTK 4) remains to be seen. 
 Ghemical – computational chemistry software package

Statistics 
 gretl — an open-source statistical package, mainly for econometrics

Various 
 Beagle – search tool
 Gramps – Genealogy software

See also

 List of free electronics circuit simulators

References

External links
 http://gnomefiles.org/ – GNOME/GTK software repository
 GTK Application Repository at ibiblio
 https://circle.gnome.org/ - A list of GNOME Circle applications

 
 
Software that uses Cairo (graphics)
Software that uses GStreamer
GTK applications